Middletown Township is the name of several townships in the United States:

Minnesota
 Middletown Township, Jackson County, Minnesota

New Jersey
 Middletown Township, New Jersey

Pennsylvania
 Middletown Township, Bucks County, Pennsylvania
 Middletown Township, Delaware County, Pennsylvania
 Middletown Township, Susquehanna County, Pennsylvania

See also

 Middletown (disambiguation)

Township name disambiguation pages